is a prefecture of Japan located in the Chūgoku region of Honshu. Okayama Prefecture has a population of 1,906,464 (1 February 2018) and has a geographic area of 	7,114 km2 (2,746 sq mi). Okayama Prefecture borders Tottori Prefecture to the north, Hyōgo Prefecture to the east, and Hiroshima Prefecture to the west.

Okayama is the capital and largest city of Okayama Prefecture, with other major cities including Kurashiki, Tsuyama, and Sōja. Okayama Prefecture's south is located on the Seto Inland Sea coast across from Kagawa Prefecture on the island of Shikoku, which are connected by the Great Seto Bridge, while the north is characterized by the Chūgoku Mountains.

History 

Prior to the Meiji Restoration of 1868, the area of present-day Okayama Prefecture was divided between Bitchū, Bizen and Mimasaka Provinces. Okayama Prefecture was formed and named in 1871 as part of the large-scale administrative reforms of the early Meiji period (1868–1912), and the borders of the prefecture were set in 1876.

Geography 

Okayama Prefecture borders Hyōgo Prefecture, Tottori Prefecture, and Hiroshima Prefecture. It faces Kagawa Prefecture in Shikoku across the Seto Inland Sea and includes 90 islands in the sea.

Okayama Prefecture is home to the historic town of Kurashiki. Most of the population is concentrated around Kurashiki and Okayama. The small villages in the northern mountain region are aging and declining in population - more than half of the prefecture's municipalities are officially designated as depopulated.

As of 1 April 2014, 11% of the total land area of the prefecture was designated as Natural Parks, namely the Daisen-Oki and Setonaikai National Parks; the Hyōnosen-Ushiroyama-Nagisan Quasi-National Park; and seven Prefectural Natural Parks.

Cities

Fifteen cities are located in Okayama Prefecture:

Towns and villages
These are the towns and villages in each district:

Mergers

Demographics

Per Japanese census data, and, Okayama prefecture has had continual negative population growth since 2005

Education

Universities 
 Okayama
 Okayama University
 Notre Dame Seishin University
 Okayama University of Science
 Okayama Shoka University
 Sanyo Gakuen University
Shujitsu University
 Kurashiki
 Okayama Gakuin University
 Kurashiki Sakuyo University
 Kawasaki University of Medical Welfare
 Soja
 Okayama Prefectural University
 Tsuyama
 Mimasaka University
 Niimi
 Niimi Public University

High schools 
 Okayama
Okayama Ichinomiya Senior High School
Okayama Asahi Senior High School
Okayama Sozan Senior High School
Okayama Hosen Senior High School
Okayama Joto Senior High School
Okayama Sakuyo High School
Kurashiki High School

Transportation

Rail
 JR West
 Sanyo Shinkansen
 Sanyo Line
 Hakubi Line
 Tsuyama Line
 Kibi Line
 Ako Line
 Uno Line
 Kishin Line
 Geibi Line
 Imbi Line
 JR West and JR Shikoku
 Seto-Ōhashi Line
 Honshi-bisan Line
 Chizu Express
 Ibara Railway
 Mizushima Rinkai Railway

Tramways
 Okayama Electric Tramway

Roads

Expressways
 Sanyo Expressway
 Chugoku Expressway
 Seto Central Expressway
 Yonago Expressway
 Okayama Expressway
 Tottori Expressway

National highways
 Route 2 (Osaka-Kobe-Himeji-Bizen-Okayama-Kurashiki-Asakuchi-Onomichi-Hiroshima-Shūnan-Shimonoseki-Kitakyushu)
 Route 30 (Okayama-Uno-Takamatsu
 Route 53 (Okayama-Tsuyama-Tottori)
 Route 179
 Route 180 (Okayama-Takahashi-Niimi)
 Route 181 (Tsuyama-Maniwa-Yonago-Yasugi-Matsue)
 Route 182
 Route 183
 Route 250 (Okayama-Setouchi-Ako-Aioi-Takasago-Akashi)
 Route 313 (Fukuyama-Takahashi-Maniwa-Kurayoshi)
 Route 373
 Route 374
 Route 429
 Route 430
 Route 482 (Kyotango-Toyooka-Wakasa-Kagamino-Maniwa-Kōfu of Tottori
 Route 484

Airport
 Okayama Airport

Culture 
 Bizen-yaki (Bizen pottery)
 Bizen Osafune/Bitchu Aoe swords

Association with Momotarō legend
Okayama Prefecture is closely associated with the folklore hero, Momotarō. This tale is said to have roots in the legendary story of Kibitsuhiko-no-mikoto and Ura which explains that the Prince Ura of Kudara used to live in Kinojo (castle of the devil) and was a cause of trouble for the people living in the village. The emperor's government sent Kibitsuhiko-no-mikoto (Momotarō) to defeat Ura. The city of Okayama holds an annual Momotarō-matsuri, or Momotarō Festival.

Arts
 Okayama Prefectural Museum
 Okayama Orient Museum
 Okayama Prefectural Museum of Art
 Hayashibara Museum of Art
 Yumeji Art Museum
 Okayama Symphony Hall
 Inryoji Temple

Sports 

The sports teams listed below are based in Okayama.

Football
 Fagiano Okayama FC (Okayama city)
 Mitsubishi Motors Mizushima FC (Kurashiki)

Volleyball
 Okayama Seagulls (Okayama city)

Basketball
 Tryhoop Okayama (B3 League, Okayama city)

Tourism 

Some tourist attractions are:
 Koraku-en Japanese garden in Okayama
 Okayama Castle, Okayama
 Ki Castle, Sōja
 Shizutani School, Bizen
 , Kurashiki
 Bitchu Matsuyama Castle, Takahashi
 Kakuzan Park, Tsuyama
 , Ibara Town (following dissolution of Bisei Town)
 Maki-do Cave, in Niimi

Notable people
 Yuko Arimori (born 1996), marathon runner
 Kenji Doihara (1883-1948), army officer
 Tesshō Genda (born 1948), voice actor
 Morihiro Hashimoto (1977-2017), darts player
 Naoki Hoshino (1892-1978), politician
 Masaki Kajishima (born 1962), creator of Tenchi Muyo!
 Shiro Kawase (1889-1946), admiral
 Shin Koyamada (born 1982), Hollywood actor
 Sadahiko Miyake (1891-1956), general
 Chiura Obata (1885-1975), artist
 Mori Takashi, former member of Gentouki
 Yōji Takikawa (born 1949), pedagogist
 Mutsuo Toi (1917-1938), perpetrator of the Tsuyama massacre
 Inukai Tsuyoshi (1855-1932), former Prime Minister of Japan
 Jiro Watanabe (born 1955), boxer
 Takeo Yasuda (1889-1964), lieutenant general
 Eisuke Yoshiyuki (1906-1940), author

Notes

References
 Nussbaum, Louis-Frédéric and Käthe Roth (2005).  Japan Encyclopedia. Cambridge: Harvard University Press. ; .

External links 

 
 Official tourism site
 
 

 
Chūgoku region
Prefectures of Japan